Best of the J. Geils Band is the first Best Of album by American rock band The J. Geils Band, released in 1979.

Track listing
"Southside Shuffle" (from Bloodshot) (Justman, Wolf) – 3:43
"Give It to Me" (from Bloodshot) (Justman, Wolf) – 6:27
"Where Did Our Love Go" [live] (from Blow Your Face Out) (Lamont Dozier, Brian Holland, Eddie Holland) – 3:55
"Ain't Nothin' But a House Party" (from Bloodshot) (Del Sharh, Joseph Thomas) – 4:43
"Detroit Breakdown" (from Nightmares...and Other Tales from the Vinyl Jungle) (Justman, Wolf) – 6:00
"Whammer Jammer" [live] (from Live Full House) (Juke Joint Jimmy) – 2:44
"I Do" (from Monkey Island) (Frank Paden, Johnny Paden, Jesse Smith, Willie Stephenson) – 3:09
"Must of Got Lost" (from Nightmares...and Other Tales from the Vinyl Jungle) (Justman, Wolf) – 2:53
"Looking for a Love" [live] (from Live Full House) (James Alexander, Zelda Samuels) – 5:03

Personnel 
Peter Wolf – lead vocals
J. Geils – guitar
Magic Dick – harmonica
Seth Justman – keyboards
Danny Klein – bass
Stephen Jo Bladd – drums

Production
Producers: Allan Blazek, J. Geils, Geoffrey Haslam, Seth Justman, Bill Szymczyk
Digital mastering: Barry Diament
Arranger: J. Geils

Charts

References

The J. Geils Band albums
1979 greatest hits albums
Albums produced by Bill Szymczyk
Atlantic Records compilation albums
Albums produced by Seth Justman